The 1902 U.S. National Championships (now known as the US Open) was a Grand Slam tennis tournament. The men's tournament was held from 18 August to 27 August on the outdoor grass courts at the Newport Casino in Newport, Rhode Island. The women's tournament was held from 24 June to 27 June on the outdoor grass courts at the Philadelphia Cricket Club in Philadelphia, Pennsylvania, United States. It was the 22nd U.S. National Championships and the second Grand Slam tournament of the year. William Larned and Marion Jones won the singles titles.

Finals

Men's singles

 William Larned defeated  Reginald Doherty  4–6, 6–2, 6–4, 8–6

Women's singles

 Marion Jones defeated  Elisabeth Moore  6–1, 1–0, ret.

Men's doubles
 Reginald Doherty /  Laurence Doherty defeated  Holcombe Ward /  Dwight F. Davis 11–9, 12–10, 6–4

Women's doubles
 Juliette Atkinson /  Marion Jones defeated  Maud Banks  /  Winona Closterman 6–2, 7–5

Mixed doubles
 Elisabeth Moore /  Wylie Grant defeated  Elizabeth Rastall /  Albert Hoskins 6–2, 6–1

References

External links
Official US Open website

 
U.S. National Championships
U.S. National Championships (tennis) by year
U.S. National Championships
U.S. National Championships
U.S. National Championships
U.S. National Championships (tennis)
U.S. National Championships (tennis)